Vladimir Pavlovich Bezobrazov (15 January 1828,  Vladimir, Imperial Russia, — 29 August 1889, Noskovo, Moscow Governorate, Imperial Russia) was one of the leading Russian economists of the 19th century; he was also a state official, magazine editor, publicist and lecturer, author of numerous essays and articles, mostly on political economy, bank system, law and finance.

Early life 
Born into and old noble Bezobrazov family, Vladimir was the son of Paul Nikolaevich Bezobrazov (1787-1852) and his wife, Elizaveta Pavlovna Poltoratskaya (1798-1888).

Biography 
A member of the Saint Petersburg Academy of Sciences (since 1864), Bezobrazov in 1860s edited the Ministry of State Properties Magazine and later the Geographical Society Herald. As a Ministry of Finance official, he took active part in organizing and monitoring Russian regional bank system. In the 1860s, at the height of the Alexander II-induced reforms, he became one of the initiators and leaders of the Russian Geographical Society's Political and Economical committee. In 1868 Bezobrazov was elected the Moscow Governorate's ; in 1885 he became a member of the Russian Senate.

He taught political economy and financial law at the Alexandrovsky Lyceum and in the 1870s tutored four members of the Russian monarch's family, Grand Dukes Alexey Alexandrovich, Nikolai Konstantinovich, Sergey Alexandrovich, and Konstantin Konstantinovich.

In 1873 Bezobrazov, part of the team of eleven renowned lawyers, co-founded the Institut de Droit International in Gent. The same year he started publishing the Russian Knowledge Anthology (Сборник государственных знаний), featuring articles and essays by leading Russian economists and lawyers.

References

External links
 Vladimir Bezobrazov at the Great Soviet Encyclopedia, 1979

Russian economists
Russian lawyers
Russian editors
Journalists from the Russian Empire
Russian male journalists
Male writers from the Russian Empire
People from Vladimir, Russia
1828 births
1889 deaths
Privy Councillor (Russian Empire)